The Pulitzer Prize for Criticism has been presented since 1970 to a newspaper writer in the United States who has demonstrated 'distinguished criticism'.  Recipients of the award are chosen by an independent board and officially administered by Columbia University.  The Pulitzer Committee issues an official citation explaining the reasons for the award.

Winners and citations
The Criticism Pulitzer has been awarded to one person annually except in 1992 when it was not awarded—43 prizes in 44 years 1970–2013. Wesley Morris is the only person to have won the prize more than once, winning in 2012 and 2021. In 2020, podcasts and audio reporting became eligible for the prize.

1970s
 1970: Ada Louise Huxtable, The New York Times, "for distinguished criticism during 1969"
 1971: Harold C. Schonberg, The New York Times, "for his music criticism during 1970"
 1972: Frank Peters Jr., St. Louis Post-Dispatch, "for his music criticism during 1971"
 1973: Ronald Powers, Chicago Sun-Times, "for his critical writing about television during 1972"
 1974: Emily Genauer, Newsday, "for her critical writing about art and artists"
 1975: Roger Ebert, Chicago Sun-Times, "for his film criticism during 1974"
 1976: Alan M. Kriegsman, The Washington Post, "for his critical writing about dance during 1975"
 1977: William McPherson, The Washington Post, "for his contribution to 'Book World'"
 1978: Walter Kerr, The New York Times, "for articles on the theater in 1977 and throughout his long career"
 1979: Paul Gapp, Chicago Tribune, architecture

1980s
 1980: William A. Henry III, The Boston Globe, "for critical writing about television"
 1981: Jonathan Yardley, Washington Star, "for his book reviews"
 1982: Martin Bernheimer, Los Angeles Times, "for classical music criticism"
 1983: Manuela Hoelterhoff, The Wall Street Journal, "for her wide-ranging criticism on the arts and other subjects."
 1984: Paul Goldberger, The New York Times, "for architectural criticism"
 1985: Howard Rosenberg, Los Angeles Times, "for his television criticism"
 1986: Donal Henahan, The New York Times, "for his music criticism"
 1987: Richard Eder, Los Angeles Times, "for his book reviews."
 1988: Tom Shales, The Washington Post, "for his television criticism"
 1989: Michael Skube, The News & Observer (Raleigh, North Carolina), "for his writing about books and other literary topics"

1990s
 1990: Allan Temko, San Francisco Chronicle, "for his architecture criticism"
 1991: David Shaw, Los Angeles Times, "for his critiques of the way in which the media, including his own paper, reported the McMartin preschool trial"
 1992: no award given
 1993: Michael Dirda, The Washington Post, "for his book reviews"
 1994: Lloyd Schwartz, Boston Phoenix, "for his skillful and resonant classical music criticism"
 1995: Margo Jefferson, The New York Times, "for her book reviews and other cultural criticism"
 1996: Robert Campbell, The Boston Globe, "for his knowledgeable writing on architecture"
 1997: Tim Page, The Washington Post, "for his lucid and illuminating music criticism"
 1998: Michiko Kakutani, The New York Times, "for her passionate, intelligent writing on books and contemporary literature"
 1999: Blair Kamin, Chicago Tribune, "for his lucid coverage of city architecture, including an influential series supporting the development of Chicago's lakefront area"

2000s
 2000: Henry Allen, The Washington Post, "for his fresh and authoritative writing on photography"
 2001: Gail Caldwell, The Boston Globe, "for her insightful observations on contemporary life and literature"
 2002: Justin Davidson, Newsday, "for his crisp coverage of classical music that captures its essence"
 2003: Stephen Hunter, The Washington Post, "for his authoritative film criticism that is both intellectually rewarding and a pleasure to read"
 2004: Dan Neil, Los Angeles Times, "for his one-of-a-kind reviews of automobiles, blending technical expertise with offbeat humor and astute cultural observations"
 2005: Joe Morgenstern, The Wall Street Journal, "for his reviews that elucidated the strengths and weaknesses of film with rare insight, authority and wit"
 2006: Robin Givhan, The Washington Post, "for her witty, closely observed essays that transform fashion criticism into cultural criticism"
 2007: Jonathan Gold, LA Weekly, "for his zestful, wide ranging restaurant reviews, expressing the delight of an erudite eater"
 2008: Mark Feeney, The Boston Globe, "for his penetrating and versatile command of the visual arts, from film and photography to painting"
 2009: Holland Cotter, The New York Times, "for his wide ranging reviews of art, from Manhattan to China, marked by acute observation, luminous writing and dramatic storytelling"

2010s
 2010: Sarah Kaufman, The Washington Post, "for her refreshingly imaginative approach to dance criticism, illuminating a range of issues and topics with provocative comments and original insights"
 2011: Sebastian Smee, The Boston Globe, "for his vivid and exuberant writing about art, often bringing great works to life with love and appreciation"
 2012: Wesley Morris, The Boston Globe, "for his smart, inventive film criticism, distinguished by pinpoint prose and an easy traverse between the art house and the big-screen box office"
Philip Kennicott of The Washington Post "for his ambitious and insightful cultural criticism, taking on topical events from the uprisings in Egypt to the dedication of the Ground Zero memorial".
Tobi Tobias "for work appearing on ArtsJournal.com that reveals passion as well as deep historical knowledge of dance".
 2013: Philip Kennicott, The Washington Post, "for his eloquent and passionate essays on art and the social forces that underlie it, a critic who always strives to make his topics and targets relevant to readers"
Mary McNamara of the Los Angeles Times "for her searching television criticism that often becomes a springboard for provocative comments on the culture at large."
Manohla Dargis of The New York Times "for her enlightening movie criticism, vividly written and showing deep understanding of the business and art of filmmaking."
 2014: Inga Saffron, The Philadelphia Inquirer, "for her criticism of architecture that blends expertise, civic passion and sheer readability into arguments that consistently stimulate and surprise"
Mary McNamara of the Los Angeles Times, "for her trenchant and witty television criticism, engaging readers through essays and reviews that feature a conversational style and the force of fresh ideas."
Jen Graves of The Stranger, Seattle, "for her visual arts criticism that, with elegant and vivid description, informs readers about how to look at the complexities of contemporary art and the world in which it's made."
 2015: Mary McNamara of the Los Angeles Times, "for savvy criticism that uses shrewdness, humor and an insider’s view to show how both subtle and seismic shifts in the cultural landscape affect television."
Manohla Dargis of The New York Times "for film criticism that rises from a sweeping breadth of knowledge – social, cultural, cinematic – while always keeping the viewer front and center."
Stephanie Zacharek of The Village Voice "for film criticism that combines the pleasure of intellectual exuberance, the perspective of experience and the transporting power of good writing."
 2016: Emily Nussbaum of The New Yorker, "for television reviews written with an affection that never blunts the shrewdness of her analysis or the easy authority of her writing."
Hilton Als of The New Yorker "for theater reviews written with such erudition and linguistic sensitivity that they often become larger than their subjects."
Manohla Dargis of The New York Times "for reviews and essays that take on the sacred cows of film culture with considerable style and admirable literary and historical reach."
 2017: Hilton Als of The New Yorker, "for bold and original reviews that strove to put stage dramas within a real-world cultural context, particularly the shifting landscape of gender, sexuality and race."
Laura Reiley of Tampa Bay Times "for lively restaurant reviews, including a series that took on the false claims of the farm-to-table movement and prompted statewide investigations."
Ty Burr of The Boston Globe "for a wide range of finely cut reviews of films and other cultural topics written with wit, deep sensibility and a refreshing lack of pretension."
 2018: Jerry Saltz of New York, "for a robust body of work that conveyed a canny and often daring perspective on visual art in America, encompassing the personal, the political, the pure and the profane."
Carlos Lozada of The Washington Post "for criticism that dug deep into the books that have shaped political discourse — engaging seriously with scholarly works, partisan screeds and popular works of history and biography to produce columns and essays that plumbed the cultural and political genealogy of our current national divide.”
Manohla Dargis of The New York Times "for writing, both downbeat and uplifting, that demonstrated the critic’s sustained dedication to exposing male dominance in Hollywood and decrying the exploitation of women in the film business."
 2019: Carlos Lozada of The Washington Post, "for trenchant and searching reviews and essays that joined warm emotion and careful analysis in examining a broad range of books addressing government and the American experience."
Jill Lepore of The New Yorker, for "critical, yet restrained, explorations of incredibly varied subjects, from Frankenstein to Ruth Bader Ginsburg, that combined literary nuance with intellectual rigor."
Manohla Dargis of The New York Times, for "authoritative film criticism that considered the impact of movies both inside the theater and in the wider world with rare passion, craftsmanship and insight."

2020s
 2020: Christopher Knight of the Los Angeles Times, for "work demonstrating extraordinary community service by a critic, applying his expertise and enterprise to critique a proposed overhaul of the L.A. County Museum of Art and its effect on the institution's mission."
Justin Davidson of New York, for "architecture reviews marked by a keen eye, deep knowledge and exquisite writing, as exemplified by his essay on Manhattan’s Hudson Yards development."
Soraya Nadia McDonald of The Undefeated, for "essays on theater and film that bring a fresh, delightful intelligence to the intersections of race and art."
 2021: Wesley Morris of the New York Times, for "unrelentingly relevant and deeply engaged criticism on the intersection of race and culture in America, written in a singular style, alternately playful and profound." Morris also won the award in 2012 and is now the first person to win the Pulitzer Prize for Criticism more than once.
Craig Jenkins of New York, for "writing on a range of popular topics, including social media, music and comedy, contending with the year’s disarray and exploring how culture and conversation can both flourish and break down online."
Mark Swed of the Los Angeles Times, for "a series of critical essays that broke through the silence of the pandemic to recommend an eclectic array of recordings as entertainment and solace essential to the moment, drawing deep connections to seven centuries of classical music."
2022: Salamishah Tillet of The New York Times, "For learned and stylish writing about Black stories in art and popular culture–work that successfully bridges academic and nonacademic critical discourse."

References

Criticism
 
Awards established in 1970
Criticism